Shilka (Shilke) is a town and the administrative center of Shilkinsky District in Zabaykalsky Krai, Russia, located on the river Shilka,  east of Chita, the administrative center of the krai. Population:

History
It was founded in the first half of the 18th century and granted town status in 1951.

Administrative and municipal status
Within the framework of administrative divisions, Shilka serves as the administrative center of Shilkinsky District, to which it is directly subordinated. As a municipal division, the town of Shilka, together with one rural locality (the selo of Mitrofanovo), is incorporated within Shilkinsky Municipal District as Shilkinskoye Urban Settlement.

References

Notes

Sources

Cities and towns in Zabaykalsky Krai
18th-century establishments in the Russian Empire